

The Amateur Athletic Union Men's Basketball All-Americans were players who competed in the Amateur Athletic Union (AAU) between 1920–21 and 1967–68 and were chosen as the best players in the league during their respective seasons. Founded in 1888, the Amateur Athletic Union is one of the largest non-profit, volunteer, sports organizations in the United States. It is dedicated exclusively to the promotion and development of amateur sports and physical fitness programs.

The era between 1921 and 1968 is referred to as the "Golden Era" of AAU basketball while companies began vying for players to compete on their teams. There was a great allure to playing AAU basketball besides job security; by remaining in the AAU as opposed to the National Basketball League or American Basketball Association, players were able to retain their "amateur" status. Only amateurs were allowed to compete in the Olympic Games, and many AAU basketball alumni went on to compete for the United States during their careers.

During this time period, thirty-three AAU All-Americans played on the United States men's national basketball team in seven different Olympic Games: Joe Fortenberry, Carl Knowles, Frank Lubin, Art Mollner, Bill Wheatley (1936); Don Barksdale, Bud Browning, Shorty Carpenter, Bob Kurland, R. C. Pitts, Cab Renick (1948); Ron Bontemps, Bob Kurland, Frank McCabe, Dan Pippin, Howie Williams (1952); Dick Boushka, Chuck Darling, Burdie Haldorson, Bob Jeangerard, K. C. Jones, Ron Tomsic, Gerry Tucker, Jim Walsh (1956); Bob Boozer, Burdie Haldorson, Adrian Smith (1960); Larry Brown, Les Lane, Jerry Shipp (1964); and Mike Barrett, John Clawson, Calvin Fowler, Jim King and Mike Silliman (1968).

Eleven AAU All-Americans have also been enshrined in the Naismith Memorial Basketball Hall of Fame as players. These players include Roger Brown, Ace Gruenig, Richie Guerin, Chuck Hyatt, K. C. Jones, Bob Kurland, Hank Luisetti, Jack McCracken, Andy Phillip, Jim Pollard, and George Yardley. Two other AAU All-Americans have been enshrined in other roles: Don Barksdale as a contributor and Larry Brown as a coach.

All-Americans by season

Most selections

This is a list for all of the All-Americans who received the honor at least three times.

10 selections
Ace Gruenig

7–9 selections
None

6 selections
Shorty Carpenter, Bob Kurland, Jack McCracken

5 selections
Forrest DeBernardi, Chuck Hyatt

4 selections
Don Barksdale, Berry Dunham, Burdie Haldorson, Frank McCabe, Jimmy McNatt, Bill Reigel, George Starbuck

3 selections
Glen Anderson, Vern Benson, George "Pidge" Browning, Howie Crittenden, Chuck Darling, Joe Fortenberry, Roy Lipscomb, Pete McCaffrey, Les O'Gara, George Reeves, Gary Thompson, Ron Tomsic, Jerry Shipp, George Williams, Howie Williams

See also
 NCAA Men's Basketball All-Americans – similar honor presented to men's basketball players in NCAA Division I competition

References

Awards established in 1921
1968 disestablishments in the United States
History of basketball
1921 establishments in the United States
Awards disestablished in 1968